Jakub Janouch (born 13 June 1990) is a Czech male volleyball player. He is part of the Czech Republic men's national volleyball team. On club level he plays for VK Dukla Liberec.

References

External links
Profile at FIVB.org

1990 births
Living people
Czech men's volleyball players
Place of birth missing (living people)